Martin Padar (born 11 April 1979 in Tallinn) is an Estonian judoka, who has competed in the men's half heavyweight (-100 kg), but now competes in the heavyweight (+100 kg) category.  A former European champion, he has also competed at two Olympics, the 2008 Beijing Olympics and the 2012 London Olympics.

Achievements

Personal
Politician Ivari Padar is Martin Padar's cousin.

References

External links
 
 

1979 births
Living people
Estonian male judoka
Judoka at the 2008 Summer Olympics
Judoka at the 2012 Summer Olympics
Olympic judoka of Estonia
21st-century Estonian people